Mayer is a common German surname and less frequent as a given name. Notable people with the name include:

Surname

Mayer
Adolf Mayer (1843–1942), a German-Dutch virologist
Albrecht Mayer (born 1965), German classical oboist
Alfred G. Mayer (1868–1922), German-American cnidariologist and entomologist
Alfred M. Mayer (1836–1897), American physicist
Arno J. Mayer (born 1926), Luxembourgish historian
Arthur Mayer (1886–1981), film producer and distributor who worked with Joseph Burstyn
Auguste Étienne François Mayer (1805–1890), French naval painter
Ben Mayer (1925–2000), amateur astronomer
Bernadette Mayer (born 1945), American poet and author
Brantz Mayer (1809–1879), American writer
Carl Mayer (1894–1944), Austrian-German screenwriter
Charles Mayer (disambiguation)
Christa Mayer, German mezzo-soprano
Christian Mayer (astronomer) (1719–1783), Czech astronomer
Christian Mayer (skier) (born 1972), Austrian skier
Christian Mayer (Wisconsin politician) (1827–1910), American politician
Christian Gustav Adolph Mayer (1839–1907), German mathematician
Christopher Mayer (American actor) (1954–2011), American actor
Christopher Mayer (Australian actor) (born 1961), Australian actor
Constant Mayer (1829–1911), French-born American painter
Daisy von Scherler Mayer (born 1965), American film director
Daniel Mayer (1909–1996), French politician
David R. Mayer (born 1967), American politician
Delia Mayer (born 1967), Swiss actress and singer
Eckehard Mayer (born 1946), German classical composer and author
Edwin Justus Mayer (1896–1960), American screenwriter
Elizabeth Mayer (1884–1970), German-American translator and writer
Else Mayer (1891–1962), German nun and women's liberation activist
Emilie Mayer (1812–1883) German composer of Romantic music
Erskine Mayer (1887–1957), American major league baseball player
Florian Mayer (born 1983), German tennis player
Francis Blackwell Mayer (1827–1899), United States painter
Frank Mayer (1902–1960), American football player
Fred Mayer (photographer) (born 1933), Swiss photographer
Fred Shaw Mayer (1899–1989), Australian zoological collector and aviculturist
Frederick Mayer (1921–2006), German educational scientist
Frederick Mayer (spy) (1921–2016), American spy during World War II
Gene Mayer (born 1956), American former tennis player
Gerhard Mayer (born 1980), Austrian discus thrower
Gisela Mayer (1931–2020), German politician
Gustav Mayer (1871–1948), German journalist and historian
Hans Ferdinand Mayer (1895–1980), German mathematician and physicist, and author of the Oslo Report
Hans-Peter Mayer (born 1944), German politician
Helen Mayer (1932–2008), Australian politician
Helene Mayer (1910–53), German and American Olympic champion foil fencer
Henry "Hy" Mayer (1868–1954), German-American animator
Irene Mayer Selznick (1907–1990), born Irene Gladys Mayer, American theatrical producer and daughter of MGM studio founder Louis B. Mayer
Jacob Erskine Mayer (1889–1957), American baseball player
Jacquelyn Mayer (born 1942), American beauty contest winner and motivational speaker
Jane Mayer (born 1955), American investigative journalist
Jean Mayer (1920–1993), French-American nutritionist and tenth president of Tufts University
Jean-François Mayer (born 1957), Swiss historian of religions
Jim Mayer (ice hockey) (born 1954), Canadian ice hockey player
Jim Mayer (musician), American musician
Johann Friedrich Mayer (agriculturist) (1719–1798), German agriculturist
Johann Friedrich Mayer (theologian) (1650–1712), German theologian
Johann Tobias Mayer (1752–1830), German physicist
John Mayer (born 1977), American singer and songwriter
John Mayer (composer) (1930–2004), Indian composer
John D. Mayer, American psychologist
Jojo Mayer (born 1963), Swiss drummer
Jorge Mayer (1915–2010), Archbishop of Bahía Blanca, Argentina
José Mayer, Brazilian actor
Joseph Edward Mayer (1904–1983), American chemist and physicist, married to Maria Goeppert-Mayer
Karl Ulrich Mayer (born 1945), German sociologist
Karla Mayer (born 1918), guard at three Nazi death camps
Karoly Mayer (1908–2000), Hungarian footballer
Klaus Mayer (1923-2022), German Roman-catholic priest and author
Lauren Etame Mayer (born 1977), Cameroonian footballer
Leonardo Mayer (born 1987), Argentine tennis player
Leopold Mayer (–1914), German swimmer
Levy Mayer (1858–1922), American lawyer
Louis B. Mayer (1884–1957), MGM studio mogul
Marcel Mayer, a French artist whose work includes sculpture, painting and engraving
Marissa Mayer (born 1975), CEO of Yahoo!
Martin Mayer (born 1928), American nonfiction author
Matthias Mayer (born 1990), Austrian retired alpine skier
Mercer Mayer (born 1943), American children's book author and illustrator
Michael Mayer (disambiguation), multiple people
Mónica Mayer (born 1954), Mexican artist, activist and art critic
Nathaniel Mayer (1944–2008), American rhythm-and-blues singer
Norman Mayer (1916–1982), American anti-nuclear activist
Oscar F. Mayer (1859–1955), founder of the Oscar Mayer Company
Paul Augustin Mayer OSB (1911–2010), German cardinal
Paul Avila Mayer (1928–2009), American television writer and producer
Peter Mayer (born 1936), American publisher
Philip Frederick Mayer (1781–1858), United States Lutheran clergyman
René Mayer (1895–1972), French politician
Richard J. Mayer (born 1939), American engineer
Robert Mayer (disambiguation), several people
Rupert Mayer (1876–1945), Jesuit priest and leading figure of the Catholic Nazi resistance
Sandy Mayer (born 1952), American former tennis player
Sarah Mayer (1896–1957), British judoka
Scott Mayer (bishop) (born 1955), American bishop
Scott Mayer (racing driver) (born 1964), American race car driver
Selma Mayer (1884–1984), known as Schwester Selma, German-Jewish head nurse at the original Shaare Zedek Hospital, Jerusalem
Sergio Mayer (born 1966) Mexican actor and singer
Sheldon Mayer (1917–1991), American cartoonist and editor
Siegmund Mayer (1842–1910), German physiologist
Stepanka Mayer (born 1949), Czech and German chess player
Stephan Mayer (born 1973), German politician 
Stephen F. Mayer (1854–1935), American politician
Svenja Mayer (born 1991), German wheelchair basketball player
Teddy Mayer (1935–2009), American racecar driver and brother of Timmy
Thomas Mayer (American economist) (1927–2015), Neo-Keynesian economist
Thomas Mayer (German economist) (born 1954), Deutsche Bank executive
Tim Mayer (born 1966), son of Teddy and racecar executive
Timmy Mayer (1938–1964), American racecar driver
Tobias Mayer (1723–1762), German astronomer
Victor Mayer (1857–1946), German jeweler
Walther Mayer (1887–1948), Austrian mathematician
Wilhelm Mayer (composer) (1831–1898), Bohemian-Austrian composer and teacher
Wilhelm Mayer (fighter pilot) (1917–1945), German Luftwaffe ace
William Mayer (composer) (1925-2017), American composer
William Daniel Mayer (born 1940), American politician
Youngmi Mayer, American comedian

Modified surname
 de Mayer
Nicholas De Mayer (c. 1631–1695), ninth mayor of New York City

 von Mayer
Julius Robert von Mayer (1814–1878), German physician and physicist who made significant contributions to early thermodynamics

Variation on surname
Mike-Mayer (surname)
Maria Goeppert-Mayer (1906–1972), German-American physicist, married to Joseph Edward Mayer
Heidrun Mohr-Mayer (born 1942), German jeweler
Herbert Mohr-Mayer (born 1933), German jeweler

Given or middle name
A first or second Hebrew name, an alternative spelling of Meir:

Hermann Mayer Salomon Goldschmidt
Mayer Lambert (1863–1930), French orientalist
Mayer Amschel Rothschild family
 Baron Mayer Amschel de Rothschild
Carl Mayer von Rothschild, founder of the Rothschild banking family of Naples
David Mayer de Rothschild
James Mayer Rothschild, founder of the Rothschild banking family of France
Mayer Alphonse James Rothschild
Mayer Amschel Rothschild
Nathan Mayer Rothschild, founder of the Rothschild banking family of England
Nathan Mayer Rothschild, 1st Baron Rothschild
Salomon Mayer von Rothschild, founder of the Rothschild banking family of Austria
Isaac Mayer Wise
Mayer Hawthorne (born 1979), stage name of American rap singer

See also

Maier
Mair (disambiguation)
Mayr
Meier
Meir (disambiguation)
Meyer (disambiguation)
Meyers
Meyr (disambiguation)
Myer (disambiguation)
Myers
Von Meyer
Majer

German-language surnames
Jewish given names
Jewish surnames
Yiddish-language surnames